William Allen Henderson  (born November 6, 1944) is a Canadian singer, songwriter, and music producer. Henderson is best known for his work as lead singer and guitarist with the group Chilliwack in the 1970s and 1980s,

Career
As a young man, Henderson performed as a guitarist in the Panorama Trio at the Vancouver Hilton Hotel's Panorama Roof restaurant.  He then helped form the psychedelic rock group The Collectors.

After The Collectors disbanded, Henderson and other former Collectors formed the band Chilliwack. The group played together for more than 30 years, and produced the hits "Lonesome Mary", "California Girl", and "My Girl (Gone, Gone, Gone)". He is also part of the folk music supergroup UHF.

As well as performing, Henderson has produced many recordings; he won the 1983 Juno Award for "Producer of the Year", with Brian MacLeod, for Chilliwack's Opus X album.  He  also won a Genie Award for best original song in a movie ("When I Sing", from Bye Bye Blues), and was musical director for the Canadian edition of Sesame Street from 1989 to 1995. Henderson was a founding inductee to the BC Entertainment Hall of Fame in 1994.

Henderson has served as director of the Canadian Association of Recording Arts and Sciences (CARAS) and as president of the Songwriters Association of Canada. In 2014 he was awarded the Special Achievement Award by SOCAN at the 2014 SOCAN Awards in Toronto.

Henderson was named a Member of the Order of Canada in 2015.

In 2016, Henderson continues to tour Canada as a solo musician and to perform  with Chilliwack.

Personal
Henderson's daughter Camille Henderson is a singer; she was a member in the early 1990s of the pop trio West End Girls, and has appeared as a guest vocalist on albums by Sarah McLachlan and Delerium. Another daughter, Saffron Henderson is a singer and voice actress.

Discography

The Collectors
 1967 – The Collectors
 1968 – Grass & Wild Strawberries

Chilliwack
 1970 – Chilliwack
 1971 – Chilliwack
 1972 – All Over You
 1974 – Riding High
 1975 – Rockerbox
 1977 – Dreams, Dreams, Dreams
 1978 – Lights from the Valley
 1980 – Breakdown in Paradise
 1981 – Wanna Be a Star
 1982 – Opus X
 1983 – Segue (compilation)
 1984 – Look In Look Out
 1994 – Greatest Hits (compilation)
 2003 – There and Back - Live

UHF
 1990 – UHF
 1994 – UHF II

References

External links
 Bill Henderson website
  Chilliwack page at the Canoe-Jam website
 Chilliwack bio  - CanadianBands.com
 Collectors bio - CanadianBands.com
 UHF bio - CanadianBands.com

1944 births
20th-century Canadian male singers
Best Original Song Genie and Canadian Screen Award winners
Canadian male guitarists
Canadian male singer-songwriters
Canadian record producers
Canadian rock guitarists
Canadian rock singers
Chilliwack (band) members
Jack Richardson Producer of the Year Award winners
Living people
Members of the Order of Canada
Musicians from Vancouver
20th-century Canadian guitarists
21st-century Canadian guitarists
21st-century Canadian male singers